Ushenish is a headland on the remote east coast of South Uist in the Outer Hebrides of Scotland. Ushenish Lighthouse has been on the headland since 1857.

Footnotes

South Uist
Headlands of Scotland
Landforms of the Outer Hebrides